The Battle of Turda lasted from 5 September to 8 October 1944, in the area around Turda, Kingdom of Romania, as part of the wider Battle of Romania. Troops from the Hungarian 2nd Army and the German 8th Army fought a defensive action against Romanian and Soviet forces. The battle was one of the largest fought in Transylvania during World War II.

Prelude

Prior to the battle, Soviet units of the 2nd Ukrainian Front occupied the Vulcan Pass, as well as the cities of Brașov and Sibiu. The Red Army intended to capture Cluj—the historical capital of Transylvania—without much effort. While continuing to advance toward the Mureș River, which the Hungarian 2nd Armored Division had been able to cross, they collided with and stopped the Hungarian units; the 2nd Hungarian Army was forced to take a defensive stance on 10 September 1944.

The battle
The Soviet Stavka (high command), was surprised by the unexpected Hungarian offensive, and decided to strengthen its forces in the area to prevent another one. It also launched an attack of their own on Turda, in tandem with the Romanian 4th Army. The town was originally defended by the weakened Hungarian 25th Infantry Division, which had only about three battalions immediately available. The other three were delayed by various rear guard actions, and were not expected before 13 September. The advancing Red Army armored units were stopped by the 3rd Battalion of the Hungarian 25th Infantry Division (headquartered at Oradea)—at the road intersection at Vințu de Sus—on 13 September. The first three Soviet tanks were knocked out by the Hungarian anti-tank gun section of the III./25 ID. The rest of the armored column then spread out and attacked the defenders. With the help of a German AT unit, the Hungarians knocked out a further 17 tanks. The attack was thus stopped, and the Soviets regrouped and retreated to defensive positions.

The Soviets and their Romanian ally attacked again on 14 September west of Turda. Luckily for the Hungarians, the 2nd Mountain Replacement Brigade had just arrived in this area, and was able to stem the onslaught. The Soviets switched their efforts to the eastern sector in the afternoon, and there they were able to break through and reach the outskirts of Turda. The town was held by the Axis thanks to a timely counterattack by the 25th Infantry Division.

On 15 September, the Soviets and Romanians launched a major attack south of Turda, preceded by a heavy artillery bombardment. They broke again in the eastern sector all the way to the outskirts of the town, but were once again stopped by the counterattack of the 2nd Armored Division. A temporary lull in the fighting ensued, which the Hungarians used to prepare for a counterattack. On 19 September, the 25th Infantry Division—supported by the 10th Assault Gun Battalion with Zrínyi IIs—attacked the Soviet 4th Guards Rifle Division, after a brief artillery barrage. They gained some ground, but the Soviets fought tenaciously and held their ground despite heavy losses. The Soviets counterattacked with three Soviet and one Romanian division—supported by a tank brigade and a Romanian armored detachment—on 22 September. The 2nd Armored Division counterattacked with only 57 tanks and could not stop them. The Hungarians lost over 1,000 men on this day alone.

Conclusion and aftermath
On 23 September, the German 23rd Panzer Division  arrived to relieve the exhausted 2nd Armored Division, but was not able to stabilize the situation, while losing over one third of its infantry. Luckily for them, the Soviets and Romanians at this point had also had enough, suffering heavy losses, and concentrated their attacks on another sector. The 25th Infantry Division remained in Turda until 8 October, when the remaining Axis forces retreated, in order to shorten their lines.

After the battle, the entire enlisted body of the III./25 ID and another company was promoted one rank up for bravery on the battlefield, an unprecedented move in the history of the Royal Hungarian Army and its forebears.

References

See also

Battles involving the Soviet Union
Battles of World War II involving Hungary
Battles of World War II involving Romania
Conflicts in 1944
Battles of World War II involving Germany
Battles and operations of the Soviet–German War
September 1944 events
October 1944 events